Coleophora neli is a moth of the family Coleophoridae. It is found in France and Italy.

The larvae feed on the leaves of Arenaria grandiflora.

References

neli
Moths described in 2000
Moths of Europe